Julio Marcelo Fleitas Silveira (born 1 September 1973) is an Ecuadorian football manager and former player who played as a defender.

Club career
Born in Montevideo, Uruguay, Fleitas is a retired player that played most of his professional career in Ecuador. Although he is Uruguayan by birth, he is a curiosity because he has never played for any professional team of Uruguay in any division. When he was just starting his career, he moved to Argentina and played there for small lower division clubs Leandro Alem and Defensa y Justicia before travelling to Ecuador to play for Olmedo.

In Riobamba, Fleitas quickly showed that he was a very versatile, brave, fast and valuable defender, helping CD Olmedo to win their first and only Ecuadorian title in 2000. He played there for 3 seasons before signing for Barcelona S.C. for two seasons, where he also played very well, but the club's poor performance in both seasons made him leave the club. Then he was transferred to Deportivo Cuenca where he played the last 3 seasons and where he helped the team to qualify to two consecutive Copa Libertadores and he became one of the team's captains. Before the end of 2008 he was transferred to Emelec due to Deportivo Cuenca's financial crisis.

International career
Fleitas has played for over 8 seasons in the Ecuadorian league and because of this he decided to become an Ecuadorian citizen. Since he was never capped for his country of birth (Uruguay), he is eligible to play for the Ecuador national team. He received his first call-up for 2010 FIFA World Cup qualifiers against Peru and Argentina. He received his first cap on June 7, 2009 against Peru in a game that Ecuador won, 1-2.

References

External links
 
 Marcelo Fleitas at BDFA.com.ar 
 
 

1973 births
Living people
Footballers from Montevideo
Uruguayan emigrants to Ecuador
Naturalized citizens of Ecuador
Association football midfielders
Uruguayan footballers
Ecuadorian footballers
Ecuador international footballers
Defensa y Justicia footballers
C.D. Olmedo footballers
Barcelona S.C. footballers
C.D. Cuenca footballers
C.S. Emelec footballers
Ecuadorian Serie A players
Expatriate footballers in Argentina
Expatriate footballers in Ecuador
Ecuadorian football managers
C.S. Emelec managers
S.D. Quito managers
C.S.D. Macará managers
Fuerza Amarilla S.C. managers